Akolzin is a rural locality (a khutor) in Tormosinovskoye Rural Settlement, Chernyshkovsky District, Volgograd Oblast, Russia. The population was 3 as of 2010. There is 1 street.

Geography 
Akolzin is located on Don Plain, on southwest of Volgograd Oblast, 43 km southeast of Chernyshkovsky (the district's administrative centre) by road. Tormosin is the nearest rural locality.

References 

Rural localities in Chernyshkovsky District